Christopher Moynihan (born April 1, 1973) is an American actor, writer and comedian. He is the creator and lead actor of the 2011 ABC sitcom Man Up!

Career 
Born in New York City, Moynihan got his first job in the entertainment business in 1997 as an actor in the short-lived series Jenny. He went on to voice acting in Gary & Mike, followed by a role on the television series The Hughleys. Christopher Moynihan went on to a recurring role on According to Jim. He was an actor, writer, and producer for 100 Questions, followed by Man Up!. He is also the creator and producer of Marlon.

Filmography

Actor

Producer/writer

References

External links

1973 births
Living people
American male television actors
American male comedians
Male actors from New York City
Comedians from New York City
21st-century American comedians